David Harry Gregory (born 6 October 1951) is an English former footballer who played in the Football League for Blackburn Rovers, Bury, Peterborough United, Portsmouth, Stoke City and Wrexham.

Career
Gregory was born in Peterborough and began his career with local club Peterborough United. In his first season with the "Posh" he made 13 appearances mostly from the bench as he slowly adjusted to life in professional football. He became a useful forward for Peterborough in the Third Division scoring 40 goals in three seasons which attracted the attentions of bigger clubs. He was signed by George Eastham at Stoke City and there was high hopes he would make the step up a division. However, he struggled to adapt to the change in level and managed just four goals for the "Potters" in 1977–78 and was sold to Blackburn Rovers in August 1978. Despite scoring four goals in his first six matches for Rovers he was moved on to Bury.

He re-found his scoring form in the third tier scoring 16 times 1978–79 and seven times in 1979–80. He moved to Portsmouth in December 1980 and his six goals helped "Pompey" gain promotion to the Third Division. He scored 15 goals in 1980–81 but he failed to find the target in 1981–82 and left for Welsh side Wrexham. He scored just five goals in 1982–83 as the "Dragons" suffered relegation to the Fourth Division. Wrexham had a poor 1983–84 season as they finished in 20th position but Gregory scored a career best of 20 goals and helped Wrexham reach the final of the Welsh Cup, which at the time allowed entrance into European competitions. He played in both legs as Fourth Division Wrexham overcame Portuguese club FC Porto but Italian side AS Roma proved too strong. He remained at Wrexham until the summer of 1986 and ended his career at with a season at his first club Peterborough United.

Career statistics
Source:

A.  The "Other" column constitutes appearances and goals in the Anglo-Scottish Cup, Football League Trophy, UEFA Cup Winners' Cup.

Honours
 Peterborough United
 Football League Fourth Division champions: 1973–74

 Portsmouth 
 Football League Fourth Division fourth-place promotion: 1979–80

References

English footballers
Stoke City F.C. players
Blackburn Rovers F.C. players
Bury F.C. players
Peterborough United F.C. players
Portsmouth F.C. players
Wrexham A.F.C. players
English Football League players
1951 births
Living people
Association football forwards